Ilias Kotsios (Greek: Ηλίας Κώτσιος; born 25 April 1977) is a former Greek footballer who played as defender. He has also played for Levadiakos, Panathinaikos, AEL, PAS Giannina and Kalloni.

Honours

Panathinaikos

(1) Greek Cup: Runner-up 2006–07

References
 Guardian Football

External links
 Onsports Profile

1977 births
Living people
Footballers from Larissa
Panathinaikos F.C. players
OFI Crete F.C. players
Greek footballers
Athlitiki Enosi Larissa F.C. players
PAS Giannina F.C. players
Association football defenders